Croydon  was an electoral district of the Legislative Assembly in the Australian state of New South Wales, created in 1927, with the abolition of proportional representation from part of the multi-member electorate of Western Suburbs, and named after and including the Sydney suburb of Croydon. It was abolished in 1959 and partly combined with Ashfield to create Ashfield-Croydon.

Members for Croydon

Election results

References

Former electoral districts of New South Wales
Constituencies established in 1927
Constituencies disestablished in 1959
1927 establishments in Australia
1959 disestablishments in Australia